Sri Lanka participated at the 2006 Asian Games, held in Doha, Qatar from December 1 to December 15, 2006. Sri Lanka ranked 32nd with 1 silver medal and 2 bronze medals in this edition of the Asian Games, all from the sports of Athletics.

Medalists

References

Nations at the 2006 Asian Games
2006
Asian Games